Paula Chaves Schulz (born September 6, 1984), born in Lobos, Argentina), is an Argentine model, actress and TV host.

Career 
Paula Chaves started participating in the reality show of models 
Super M 2003 where she won the opportunity to start her modelling career, first as a member of the team of Ricardo Piñeiro Modelos 
and later as part of the team of Multitalent. In 2005 she debuts as co-television host in Princesitas issued on the screen of  Canal 13. In 2009 she made a special participation in the children's television series Niní. Paula Chaves participated in the dance reality show Bailando 2010 hosted by Marcelo Tinelli. In 2011 she conducted with Darío Lopilato the program Extra pequeño issued on the screen of Canal 13. That same year she made a special participation in Los únicos. She debuted on stage in the summer of 2011-2012 starring in the work Despedida de soltero.  Paula Chaves also stars in the video clip "Frío" from Ricky Martin. In 2014 she returned as a television host with José María Listorti at the head of the cycle Este es el show issued on the screen of  Canal 13. In 2015 she made a special participation in Socios por accidente 2. In 2017 she ends the cycle conduction of Este es el show and says goodbye to the screen of  Canal 13 and from the producer Ideas del Sur. In 2018 she makes the big pass to the screen of Telefe in front of the reality show of pastry Bake Off Argentina produced by Turner Broadcasting System Latin America. After finishing the culinary program, she makes small participations in the channel as a guest television host in Por el Mundo, the travel success program hosted by Marley and replace Verónica Lozano in her program Cortá por Lozano. She was the television host of  Todo por mi hija, el adelanto and Todo por mi hija, así comenzó issued on the screen of Telefe. In summer 2018-2019 she returns to the stage, starring Locos por Luisa with her husband Pedro Alfonso.

Personal life 
In 2010 Paula Chaves met Pedro Alfonso in Bailando 2010 living his fledgling romance as if it were a reality show since he was a producer of Ideas del Sur and she participated in the program Bailando 2010 her flirting and first approaches were given in front of the cameras of that program and two other cycles of the same producer Este es el show and  La cocina del Show. In March 2011 after several fights they decided to end their relationship, although this would be only a 3-month in-pass, and on June 23, 2011, they resumed their relationship, but this time hidden from the media, it was on July 9, 2011, when they made public their reunion sealing their love in a musical in the program Sabado Show. In January 2013 Paula Chaves got engaged to Pedro Alfonso and on February 15, 2013, they announced that they were expecting their first baby. On August 23, 2013, she gave birth to the couple's first child, a girl called Olivia Alfonso. On September 8, 2014, she got married in a civil ceremony with Pedro Alfonso. October 4, 2014, she got married in a religious ceremony to Pedro Alfonso. In September 2015, she announced that they were expecting their second baby, but a month later, the media announced that she had lost the pregnancy naturally. On March 28, 2016, she announced that she was pregnant again. On October 2, 2016, she gave birth to the couple's second child, a boy called Baltazar Alfonso. In December 2019, she announced that they were expecting their third baby. On July 4, 2020, she gave birth to the couple's third child, a girl called Filipa Alfonso.

Filmography

Television programs

Television

Movies

Videoclips

References

1984 births
Living people
Argentine female models
Jewish models
Argentine Jews
21st-century Argentine women
Participants in Argentine reality television series
Bailando por un Sueño (Argentine TV series) participants